Hyon Chol-hae (August 13, 1934 – May 19, 2022) was a North Korean military officer.

He was born in Yanji, Jilin province in Manchukuo.

During the Korean War, Hyon served as Kim Il-sung's bodyguard, a role which gave him "a place in North Korea's revolutionary history". He was director of the General Logistics Department of the Korean People's Army from 1986 to 1995, when he was appointed deputy director of the General Political Department, becoming one of the most senior members of the North Korean military and political leadership. He was described as being in "close proximity" to Kim Jong-il, and as reporting directly to him. It had been suggested that, following the death of Kim Jong-il, he may have taken part in a military council leadership of the country. He was transferred to director of the Standing Bureau of the National Defence Commission. He was a member of the Central Committee of the Workers' Party of Korea since 1991 until his death.

In April 2012, he received important promotions as Vice Marshal, member of the Workers' Party of Korea's Politburo and Central Military Commission, first vice-minister of the People's Armed Forces and director of the army's General Logistics Department.

He was replaced as first vice-minister of defence by his own predecessor as logistics director Jon Chang-bok in May 2013.

On April 15, 2016, Hyon Chol-hae became the fifth person to be promoted to the rank of Marshal of the Korean People's Army, being one of the first two promotions of active duty officers after 21 years.

Death
Hyon died from multiple organ failure on May 19, 2022, at the age of 87, amid a COVID-19 outbreak. He received a state funeral, lying in state at the April 25 House of Culture in which supreme leader Kim Jong-un personally bore his casket and placed dirt upon his grave at the Patriotic Martyrs' Cemetery. On his funeral committee, chaired by Kim Jong-un, were:

 Kim Jong-un
 Choe Ryong-hae
 Jo Yong-won
 Kim Tok-hun
 Pak Jong-chon
 Ri Pyong-chol
 Ri Il-hwan
 Jong Sang-hak
 O Su-yong
 Thae Hyong-chol
 Kim Jae-ryong
 Kim Yong-chol
 Jong Kyong-thaek
 Pak Jong-gun
 Rim Kwang-il
 O Il-jong
 Ho Chol-man
 Pak Thae-dok
 Kim Hyong-sik
 Yu Jin
 Pak Myong-sun
 Ri Chol-man
 Kim Song-nam
 Jon Hyon-chol
 Yang Sung-ho
 Ju Chol-gyu
 Ri Son-gwon
 Ri Thae-sop
 Kim Yong-hwan
 Kang Yun-sok
 Ri Song-hak
 Pak Hun
 Kim Song-ryong
 Pak Yong-il
 Ju Chang-il
 Ri Tu-song
 Kang Sun-nam
 Kim Pong-chol
 Ri Chang-song
 Kim Yong-gwang
 Pak Jong-nam
 Ri Hi-yong
 Kim Jo-guk
 Hong Sung-mu
 Jo Yong-chol
 Jang Kwang-myong
 Kim Tong-il
 Sin Ryong-man
 Mun Kyong-dok
 An Kum-chol
 Pak Chang-ho
 Pak Song-chol
 Kang Pong-hun
 Kim Su-gil
 Kim Chol-sam
 Ri Jong-nam
 Ri Thae-il
 Ri Jae-nam
 Sin Yong-chol
 Jang Yong-rok
 Ri Myong-su
 Choe Tu-yong
 Kim Jong-gwan
 Kwon Thae-yong
 Kim Song-gi
 Jo Kyong-chol
 Pak Yong-il
 Ri Chang-ho
 Ju Tong-chol
 Kim Kyong-ryong
 Sin Ki-chol
 Pang Tu-sop
 Yang Tong-hun
 Ri Tong-chun
 Kim Sang-gap
 im Kwang-hyok
 Ri Chol
 Kim Chol-gun
 Yun Pyong-gwon
 Jong Myong-do
 An Ji-yong
 Kim Yong-bok
 O Pyong-chol
 Kim To-un
 Jang Il-gon
 Choe Pae-sik
 Choe Kwon-sik
 Kim Myong-sik
 im Kwang-hyok
 Kim Jong-gil
 Park Su-il
 Ryo Chol-ung
 Pak Kwang-ju
 Choe Kil-ryong
 Ri Pong-chun
 Choe Kwang-il
 Ri Kyong-chol
 Choe Chun-gil
 Kim Hak-chol
 Song Yong-gon
 Ko Myong-su
 Ko In-chol
 Song Sok-won
 Ki Yong-jun
 Kim Jong-chol
 Kim Chol-hi
 Hong Chol-ung
 O Jong-su
 Kim Song-chol
 Kim Chang-guk
 Om Ju-ho
 Ri Yong-chol
 Kim Pong-ho
 Pak Yong-gwan
 Yu Kwang-u
 An Yong-sik
 Ham Hyo-sik
 Kim Yong-ul
 Han Myong-son
 Kim Chol-nam
 Kim Kyong-hun
 Han Phyo-sop
 Ri Hong-gwang
 Hwang Chol-ju
 Rim Tae-song
 Ri Song-min
 Ri Jong-son
 Jong Chol-ho
 Jong Kyong-il
 Jong Tong-chol
 Kim Kwang-il
 Kwak Chang-sik
 So Hong-chan
 Kim Pok-nam
 Rim Yong-chol
 Sim Hong-bin
 Choe Kwang-jun
 Ri Song-ryol
 Kim Yong-ho
 Rim Kwang-ung
 Pak Thae-song
 Kim Yong-nam
 Ko Kil-son
 O Tong-il
 Song Ki-chol
 Jang Ki-ho
 Kim Yu-il
 Jon Hak-chol
 Kim Chung-gol
 Ma Jong-son
 Jang Chun-song
 Kang Jong-gwan
 Kim Chol-su
 Han Ryong-guk
 Kim Jong-nam
 Wang Chang-uk
 Ju Yong-il
 So Jong-jin
 Ri Hyok-gwon
 Song Chun-sop
 Ri Chung-gil
 Kim Sung-jin
 Im Kyong-jae
 Kim Sung-du
 Kim Il-guk
 Chae Song-hak
 Ri Chol-san
 Kim Kum-chol
 Cha Myong-nam
 Kim Chung-song
 Kim Kwang-il
 Jang Kyong-il
 Im Hak-won
 Ko Jong-bom
 Yun Jong-ho
 Kim Song-jun
 Pak Hyok-chol
 Choe Kyong-chol
 Sung Jong-gyu
 Kang Kwon-il
 Mun Chol
 Pak In-chol
 Han Jong-hyok
 Kim Jong-sun

Awards and honors
A frame with Kim's awards and honors was displayed during his funeral, showing all the decorations he had received.

References

1934 births
2022 deaths
Deaths from multiple organ failure
North Korean generals
Members of the 6th Politburo of the Workers' Party of Korea
Members of the 6th Central Committee of the Workers' Party of Korea
Alternate members of the 6th Central Committee of the Workers' Party of Korea
People from Kyongwon County
People from North Hamgyong
Deaths from the COVID-19 pandemic in North Korea